Marginella desjardini is a species of sea snail, a marine gastropod mollusk in the family Marginellidae, the margin snails.

Description

Distribution
This marine species occurs off Senegal.

References

 Cossignani T. (2006). Marginellidae & Cystiscidae of the World. L'Informatore Piceno. 408pp

External links
 Marche-Marchad, I. (1957). Description de cinq Gastropodes marins nouveaux de la côte occidentale d'Afrique. Bulletin du Muséum National d'Histoire Naturelle, Paris. ser. 2, 29(2): 200-205, 1 pl.

desjardini
Gastropods described in 1957